The bowling competitions at the 2019 Southeast Asian Games in the Philippines was held from 3 to 8 December 2019 at Coronado Lanes within Starmall EDSA-Shaw in Mandaluyong, Metro Manila.

Events 
The following events will be contested:

Singles
Doubles
Mixed doubles
Team of 4
Masters

Participating nations

  (8)
  (8)
  (8)
  (6)
  (7)
  (8)
  (8)
  (4)

Medal table

Medalists

Men

Women

Mixed

References

External links